Deudorix ecaudata, the untailed playboy, is a butterfly in the family Lycaenidae. It is found in Kenya (east of the Rift Valley), northern Tanzania and Malawi. The habitat consists of thornbush savanna.

The larvae feed on Acacia species and are associated with ants of the genus Pheidole.

References

Butterflies described in 1963
Deudorigini
Deudorix